Bárbaro Díaz (born 28 August 1960) is a Cuban water polo player. He competed at the 1980 Summer Olympics and the 1992 Summer Olympics. 

Díaz moved to Brazil in 1994, where he became a coach; he coached the Brazil men's national water polo team at the 2007 Pan American Games.

References

1960 births
Living people
Cuban male water polo players
Olympic water polo players of Cuba
Water polo players at the 1980 Summer Olympics
Water polo players at the 1992 Summer Olympics
Place of birth missing (living people)